Milan Malatinský (8 February 1970 – 15 May 2018) was a Slovak football player and manager.

He played for Spartak Trnava, Dukla Banská Bystrica and Inter Bratislava. He was participant of 1989 FIFA World Youth Championship.

His uncle Anton Malatinský was a most successful manager of Spartak Trnava in history and the club stadium is named after him.

References

 

1970 births
2018 deaths
Slovak footballers
Slovakia international footballers
FK Dukla Banská Bystrica players
FC Spartak Trnava players
FK Inter Bratislava players
Slovak Super Liga players
Slovak football managers
FC Spartak Trnava managers
Association football midfielders
Sportspeople from Trnava